Gifi Bias XIII  were a French Rugby league club based in Bias, Lot-et-Garonne, in the Aquitaine region. The club played in the French National Division 1 and National Division 2 leagues during its time. Founded in 1961, the club moved to Pujols, Lot-et-Garonne in 2014 and changed names to US Pujols XIII

History 

Gifi Bias XIII were founded in 1961 but the club would have to wait for over 30 years before their first final appearance. That came in 1995 when they won the Coupe Falcou and by the end of the season they had completed a league and cup double after defeating RC Lescure-Arthes XIII in the National 2 nowadays the National Division 1 league final 34-12. By the time of the new millennium though the club found itself back in the bottom tier. In season 2001/02 they won promotion back to the National 2 after winning against Aspet XIII 18-10. Back in the National 2 the club enjoyed a successful season winning the Coupe Falcou for a second time and reaching the league final against Aspet XIII in a repeat of the previous Federal Division final, this time though they lost out 9-16 but were promoted to the 2nd tier for the first time. After a couple of seasons in the Elite Two Championship Gifi reached the league final in 2007 and against all odds won 16-14 against Racing Club Albi XIII. The club decided not to take up the offer if promotion to the top flight and this led to the team slowly breaking up. By 2012 the club were back in the 4th tier after suffering successive relegations. In 2014 a decision was made to leave their base in Bias and move to nearby Pujol. The club also decided to change the name of the club to reflect this, thus becoming US Pujols XIII. The 'Lion' was maintained in the new club's logo.

Honours 

 Elite Two Championship (1): 2006–07
 National Division 1 (National 2) (1): 1994–95
 National Division 2 (Federal Division) (1): 2001–02
 Coupe Falcou (2): 1995, 2003

See also

National Division 2
US Pujols XIII

French rugby league teams
1961 establishments in France
2014 disestablishments in France
Defunct rugby league teams in France
Rugby clubs established in 1961